The 2013 Shepherd Rams football team represented Shepherd University as a member of the Mountain East Conference (MEC) during the 2013 NCAA Division II football season. Led by 27th-year head coach Monte Cater, the Rams compiled an overall record of 11–1 with a mark of 9–0 in conference play, winning the MEC title. Shepherd advanced to the NCAA Division II Football Championship playoffs and received a first-round bye. The Rams played their home games at Ram Stadium in Shepherdstown, West Virginia.

This was Shepherd's first season as a member of the MEC, having been a member of the now-defunct West Virginia Intercollegiate Athletic Conference.

Regular season
The 2013 regular season for the Rams consisted of nine games against MEC conference opponents and one non-conference game against  of the Pennsylvania State Athletic Conference (PSAC). The Rams went an undefeated 10–0 in the regular season and advanced to the 2013 NCAA Division II football playoffs as the number one seed in Super Region 1. The Rams won the MEC Championship after a season finale win against Concord.

Playoffs
The Rams won their first playoff game, a second round game at home against , after receiving a bye in the first round. The team then went on to lose their quarterfinal game, 28–7, against the third-seeded .

Schedule

References

Shepherd
Shepherd Rams football seasons
Shepherd Rams football